, also known monomously as Keita (stylized KEITA), is a Japanese singer and actor. Since 2000, he rose to fame as the lead vocalist from the boy band W-inds. During that time, he launched a solo career, and in 2012, has revitalized it again under a reinvented image.

In addition to music, Tachibana also launched an acting career and has appeared in television dramas such as Ohitorisama and Mattsugu.

Career 

At age 14, Tachibana was only male finalist in the 2000 Kyushu-Okinawa Starlight Audition. Afterwards, he was scouted and became part of W-inds with Ryuichi Ogata and Ryohei Chiba.  In addition to his singing and dancing talents, Keita plays keyboard and guitar.

Solo career
In addition to Tachibana's activities in W-inds, he launched a solo career, with his debut single "Michishirube" releasing on 18 October 2006. "Michishirube" served as the first ending theme to the anime Reborn! and debuted at No. 3 on the Oricon Weekly Singles Chart. Shortly after the release of "Michishirube", Tachibana's first solo album, Koe, was released on 29 November 2006, and debuted at No. 5 in the first week on Oricon Weekly Albums Chart. Following its success, Tachibana's second single, "Friend", was released in May 2007 as the first opening theme song to the anime Blue Dragon.

In 2007, Tachibana voiced Prince Arthur in the Japanese dubbed version of Shrek the Third, as his first starring role. In 2009, he played Hiroyuki Harada in the television drama Ohitorisama.

Late in 2012, Tachibana announced his intent to restart his solo career, this time under a mononymous, romanized stage name, Keita. His first single under his new name, "Slide 'n' Step", released on 20 February 2013.

Personal life 
Tachibana is the second oldest of four siblings. He is the older brother of model, actress, and former singer Mio Tachibana.

On 4 August 2013, Tachibana announced he registered his marriage to Aya Matsuura after almost 12 years of dating. Their wedding ceremony was held in Oahu, Hawaii on 7 October. On 24 December 2014, Tachibana and Matsuura announced via their agencies that they gave birth to a girl. In July 2018, Tachibana announced the birth of his second child.

Discography

Albums

Extended plays

Singles

Promotional singles

Filmography

Films

Television

Radio

Tours 

 Keita Side By Side Tour 2013 (2013)

Awards and accolades

References

External links 
 Official blog: Michishirube, /tachibana-keita/ at Ameblo.jp 

1985 births
Living people
Japanese male pop singers
W-inds members
People from Fukuoka
Musicians from Fukuoka Prefecture
21st-century Japanese singers
21st-century Japanese male singers